Russula albobrunnea is a fungus in the family, Russulaceae, found Nothofagus forests (N. cunninghamii, N. moorei) of Queensland.

It was first described in 2007 by Teresa Lebel and Jennifer Tonkin.

References

albobrunnea
Taxa named by Teresa Lebel